Players and pairs who neither have high enough rankings nor receive wild cards may participate in a qualifying tournament held one week before the annual Wimbledon Tennis Championships.

Seeds

  Maureen Drake /  Carly Gullickson (first round)
  Alona Bondarenko /  Anastasia Rodionova (qualified)
  Klaudia Jans /  Alicja Rosolska (first round)
  Līga Dekmeijere /  Jasmin Wöhr (first round)
  Mervana Jugić-Salkić /  Martina Müller (first round)
  Yuliana Fedak /  Lilia Osterloh (qualifying competition, lucky losers)
  Teryn Ashley /  Lindsay Lee-Waters (first round)
  Caroline Dhenin /  Stéphanie Foretz (first round)

Qualifiers

  Evie Dominikovic /  Aiko Nakamura
  Alona Bondarenko /  Anastasia Rodionova
  Rika Fujiwara /  Saori Obata
  Tatiana Poutchek /  Anastasiya Yakimova

Lucky losers

  Yuliana Fedak /  Lilia Osterloh
  Erica Krauth /  Marie-Ève Pelletier
  Edina Gallovits /  Angela Haynes

Qualifying draw

First qualifier

Second qualifier

Third qualifier

Fourth qualifier

External links

2005 Wimbledon Championships on WTAtennis.com
2005 Wimbledon Championships – Women's draws and results at the International Tennis Federation

Women's Doubles Qualifying
Wimbledon Championship by year – Women's doubles qualifying
Wimbledon Championships